John Daly (born 7 August 1956) is a Puerto Rican former swimmer who competed in the 1976 Summer Olympics.

References

1956 births
Living people
Puerto Rican male swimmers
Male butterfly swimmers
Olympic swimmers of Puerto Rico
Swimmers at the 1976 Summer Olympics